Bergonzoli is an Italian surname and may refer to:

Giulio Bergonzoli (19th century), Italian sculptor
Annibale Bergonzoli (1884–1973), general in the Royal Italian Army

See also
 Bergonzoni, (1646–1700), Italian painter